The 2nd Vanier Cup was played on November 19, 1966, at Varsity Stadium in Toronto, Ontario, and decided Canada's university football champions by way of a national invitation to participate in the game. The St. Francis Xavier X-Men and the Waterloo Lutheran Golden Hawks were invited by a national panel to compete in a single elimination game to decide the Canadian college football champion for the 1966 season. The X-Men won their first ever championship by defeating the Golden Hawks by a score of 40-14.

References

External links
 Official website

Vanier Cup
Vanier Cup
1966 in Toronto
November 1966 sports events in Canada
Canadian football competitions in Toronto